Suhani is an Indian feminine given name. Notable people with the name include:
Suhani Dhanki
Suhani Si Ek Ladki
Suhani Shah
Suhani Pittie
Suhani Kalita
Suhani Gandhi
Suhani Thadani
Suhani Jalota

Indian feminine given names